Hadrien David (born 26 February 2004), is a French racing driver who currently competes in the Formula Regional European Championship with R-ace GP. He was the youngest FIA Formula 4 Champion when he  won the French F4 Championship in 2019, at the age of 15.

Career

Karting 
David started karting at the age of 8 on the Karting de Royan track in his hometown. He started in official competition in 2013 in the Mini-kart category and finished third in the Coupe de France, first in the Poitou-Charentes regional championship and second in the Center Region. In 2014, he finished fifth in the Coupe de France and the French Championship in the Minime category, David was also best rookie. That same year, he entered the 10-153 program of the French Federation of Automobile Sport (FFSA). In 2015, he won the French Cup, the Rotax Challenge and finished third in the French Championship in the same category and became a member of the French Karting Team.

In 2016, he made his international debut and became Belgian Champion in X30 Cadet. He again won the Coupe de France and became Champion of France Cadet. In two years, he participated in 30 national and international competitions, climbed 28 times on the podium and won 26 victories. From 2017, he improved his international presence and finished fourth in the European Championship and third in Genk, German Championship and in the OK-Junior category. In 2018, he won the WSK at La Conca in the same category and won a round of the German Championship in Genk in the OK category.

Lower formulae 

In 2019, David joined the French F4 Championship. In preparation for this season, he also participated in the F4 SEA Championship, using the same Mygale M14-F4-Renault as the French championship. David won 6 of the 8 races he participated in along with 1 second place and 1 seventh place.

In the opening round in the French F4 series at Nogaro, he won two of the three races, along with two poles and all three fastest laps, allowing him to take the lead in the championship. He won his third victory of the season at Pau. He won again at Lédenon, and despite some complicated races due to contact with other drivers resulting in him finishing 9th and 16th, David still lead the championship with Réunion's Reshad de Gerus being his only real championship rival. David won two new victories on the Hungaroring and from this point to the end of the season David didn't fail to step on the podium once with one more victory at Paul Ricard. This victory made David the youngest driver to win any FIA Formula 4 category at the age of 15 with a total of 280 points.

Driving as a guest driver for R-ace GP in the 2019 ADAC Formula 4 Championship at Circuit Zandvoort and Nürburgring. David's best finish was 7th at the final race in Nürburgring, he then returned to the French F4 Championship where he was competing in full time.

Formula Renault Eurocup 
In October 2019, David partook in the post-season test at Yas Marina with R-ace GP and MP Motorsport. The following January, it was confirmed David would make his debut in the upcoming season with the latter, partnering Franco Colapinto. Speaking of that opportunity before the season, Renault Academy boss Mia Sharizman remarked that the series was "an excellent platform to develop and test Hadrien David's talent". However, the Frenchman experienced a slow first half of the season, which included a streak of four consecutive races without points. David would improve in the second half, scoring consistent points finishes and finishing on the podium in Imola. He ended up finishing tenth in the standings, seven positions behind teammate Franco Colapinto.

Formula Regional European Championship

2021 

In 2021 the Frenchman competes in the Formula Regional European Championship for R-ace GP, alongside Léna Bühler, Zane Maloney and fellow countryman Isack Hadjar. David's first podium came in the first race, with third place in Imola. He finished race two in fourth. David eventually ended 2nd in the standings.

2022 

David remained with R-ace GP for the 2022 Formula Regional European Championship, as he was unable to find the budget to step up to the 2022 FIA Formula 3 Championship. At the start of the season, he partook in the Formula Regional Asian Championship for the first two rounds, taking two victories and placing 9th in the standings.

FIA Formula 3 Championship 
At the end of September, David partook in the FIA Formula 3 post-season test with Carlin during the second day.

Formula One 
As reward for winning the French F4 title, David became a member of the Renault Sport Academy in January 2020. He was released following the academy's rebrand as Alpine Academy.

David was re-signed by the structure in March 2022, this time as a member of their new Alpine Affiliate programme. After just a year, David left the programme.

Karting record

Karting career summary 

† As David was a guest driver, he was ineligible to score points.

Complete Karting World Championship results

Racing record

Racing career summary 

† As David was a guest driver, he was ineligible to score points.
* Season still in progress.

Complete French F4 Championship results 
(key) (Races in bold indicate pole position) (Races in italics indicate fastest lap)

Complete Formula Renault Eurocup results 
(key) (Races in bold indicate pole position) (Races in italics indicate fastest lap)

‡ Half points awarded as less than 75% of race distance was completed.

Complete Formula Regional European Championship results 
(key) (Races in bold indicate pole position) (Races in italics indicate fastest lap)

Complete Formula Regional Asian Championship results 
(key) (Races in bold indicate pole position) (Races in italics indicate the fastest lap of top ten finishers)

References

External links 
 

2004 births
Living people
French racing drivers
Formula Renault Eurocup drivers
ADAC Formula 4 drivers
People from Royan
MP Motorsport drivers
Formula Regional Asian Championship drivers
Formula Regional European Championship drivers
Sportspeople from Charente-Maritime
French F4 Championship drivers
R-ace GP drivers
Team Meritus drivers
Karting World Championship drivers
Italian F4 Championship drivers